Distraction Pieces is the second solo album by Scroobius Pip, released on 19 September 2011. It entered and peaked at No. 35 on the UK albums chart.

Track listing

References

External links

2011 albums
Scroobius Pip albums
Strange Famous Records albums